Miha Štebih (born April 7, 1992) is a Slovenian professional ice hockey Defenseman who is currently playing for Cracovia in the Polish Hockey League (Phl) and the Slovenian national team. He participated at the 2015 IIHF World Championship.

References

External links

1992 births
Living people
BK Mladá Boleslav players
HC Dukla Jihlava players
HC Oceláři Třinec players
HC Slavia Praha players
Slovenian ice hockey defencemen
Sportspeople from Maribor
EC VSV players
Wichita Falls Wildcats players
Les Aigles de Nice players
MKS Cracovia (ice hockey) players
HC Frýdek-Místek players
HK Olimpija players
Slovenian expatriate ice hockey people
Slovenian expatriate sportspeople in Austria
Slovenian expatriate sportspeople in France
Slovenian expatriate sportspeople in the United States
Slovenian expatriate sportspeople in the Czech Republic
Slovenian expatriate sportspeople in Sweden
Expatriate ice hockey players in Austria
Expatriate ice hockey players in France
Expatriate ice hockey players in the United States
Expatriate ice hockey players in the Czech Republic
Expatriate ice hockey players in Sweden